The 944 Cup is a grassroots motorsports road racing series dedicated to the front-engine water-cooled Porsche 944. The race series was created as a standalone series which began operating as such within numerous sanctioning bodies. The series was founded by the current National Director, Dave Derecola, and his son Chris Derecola, who continue to own and operate the series. The series currently races within the Porsche Club of America, under the direction of the National Director as a guest series.

Chapters 

Racing under the 944 Cup rule set is currently possible in two regional chapters, East and West, and a pair of National Championship runoff events each year. The following are the only currently recognized official chapters of the 944 Cup National Series:

In addition to providing for Regional Championships, the series held its inaugural national championship in September 2006 and a subsequent one in every year following. The yearly events invites all 944 Cup racers to compete on the same track over the course of 2–3 days to crown a National Champion.

Classes 

The series includes 3 classes: Spec, Cup and Super Cup for the front-engine water cooled Porsches, including the various models of the 924S, 944, 944S, 944S2, 951, 951T and the 968. The Spec and Cup Class is designed for normally aspirated eight (8) valve front-engined Porsches. The Super Cup Class is designed primarily for higher horsepower cars such as the sixteen (16) valve normally aspirated and turbo equipped front-engine Porsches.

Rules 

For each Class, allowed modifications for each category of car and corresponding minimum weights are described in detail in the rules. The 944 Cup rules also include by rule all PCA SP1, SP2, SP3, B, C, E and F class front engine Porsches, SCCA ITS 944's and all NASA 944 Specs cars are also eligible, along with many NASA GTS1 and GTS2 cars.

Most front engine Porsches racing in PCA, SCCA and NASA are eligible. No 944 Cup membership or annual dues are required to race in the series. A current race competition license is required from PCA with two routes to obtaining a PCA Club Racing License. A current physical exam certification is required.

1) Via an existing, current full-competition license with current experience from a recognized road-racing sanctioning organization, including NASA, SCCA, POC, IMSA, USCR, BMWCCA or equivalent sanctioning body, or any vintage group which is a member of the Vintage Motorsport Council.

Or, 2) the member must meet the race-track driving-experience requirements as defined in the licensing procedures in the Club Racing Rule Book and successfully complete the PCA Club Racing School which occurs the first day of every club race weekend.

History 

The 944 Cup started with one class for normally aspirated / 8 valve 944s in  2002 at a race at Summit Point on June 22 with 16 racers entered. The race was held with NASA but as an independently owned and operated race series. The series had 6 rounds of racing that year. Designed as a place to race for nearly all front-engine Porsches, the series added a second class in 2004, Super Cup, for the more powerful 944s.

Now racing in its 19th season, the series has hosted more than 500 individual races with over 2,500 racer entries. Along the way, it has visited some of the most storied tracks in motorsports history, a list that includes Virginia International Raceway, Mid-Ohio Sports Car Course, Watkins Glen International Raceway and Daytona International Raceway. To create a safe and well-organized racing environment, the 944 Cup has partnered with many clubs and sanctioning bodies, including World Challenge, PCA, SCCA Club Racing, SCCA Pro Racing, Brian Redman's Intercontinental Events, Rennsport Reunion, Calabogie Motor Club, Autobahn Motor Club, NASCAR of Canada, NASA and EMRA.

The 944 Cup now races all of its events with the Porsche Club of America. The first contact from PCA with the series regarding the prospect of adding 944 Cup classes for the club was in late 2005. As a result, PCA added two Cup classes in 2006: the SP2 representing the 944 Cup class and SP3 representing the 944 Super Cup class. The series Cup officially split from its original partner club NASA in 2008, when NASA decided to move their Nationals to Utah.  
 
Several other series have developed directly out of the Cup series by former Cup directors, including NASA's 944 Spec, NASA's GTS and the 944 Canada Challenge.

External links 
 944 Cup Series Homepage
 944 Cup Rules 
 944 Cup Facebook
 944 Cup Talk Forums
 944 Cup Chapters/Schedules/Standings
  944 Cup Regional and National Champions

Sports car racing series
One-make series
Auto racing series in the United States
Porsche in motorsport
2002 establishments in the United States